Fear of the Unknown is the debut solo album by British musician Martin Briley. It was released in 1981 on Mercury Records. Though most of the album features the same brand of pop that he would play throughout his solo career, the title track is a final salute to Briley's progressive rock background, featuring menacing distorted vocals and paranoiac violin riffs reminiscent of King Crimson.

Fear of the Unknown is more self-contained than most of Briley's solo albums, being the only one on which he played all the guitars himself, and the only one which he co-produced.

Artwork 
The artwork for Fear of the Unknown was painted by Norman Walker. Briley himself had a lot of input on the artwork, having studied graphic design, and wanted the album to have a photo-realistic cover.

Track listing 
All songs written and arranged by Martin Briley.
"Slipping Away" – 3:22
"The Man I Feel" – 4:02
"I Feel Like a Milkshake" – 3:53
"First to Know" – 3:06
"Heart of Life" – 5:00
"A Little Knowledge Is a Dangerous Thing" – 3:12
"I Don't Feel Better" – 3:12
"More of the Same" – 2:56
"One Step Behind" – 5:49
"Fear of the Unknown" – 3:57

Personnel
Martin Briley – lead and backing vocals, guitars, bass, percussion
Robert Brissette – bass, backing vocals
 – piano, violin
Tommy Mandel – synthesizers
Eric Parker – drums
Eric Troyer – backing vocals

References

External links
 Official Martin Briley website

1981 debut albums
Martin Briley albums
Mercury Records albums